Stapelia leendertziae is a species of succulent plant in the family Apocynaceae. It is endemic to South Africa and Zimbabwe.  Its natural habitats are subtropical or tropical dry shrubland and rocky areas. 

Its flower mimics the smell, color, and texture of decaying flesh to attract flies to lay their eggs on its corolla as a form of pollination.

References

Flora of South Africa
leendertziae
Least concern plants
Taxa named by N. E. Brown